Vujadin "Vuja" Radovanović (born January 12, 1962, in Mladenovac) is a Serbian comic-book and graphic novel creator.

Biography

He obtained his degree at the Faculty of Architecture in Belgrade. He debuted in Yugoslav comics industry in 1984, as member of "Bauhaus 7" art group, together with Zoran Tucić, Rade Tovladijac and Saša Živković.

Radovanović is known best for his comics "Čuvari zaboravljenog vremena" (writer: Miroslav Marić), "Džo XX" (writer: Marko Fančović), "Projekat Uskrsnuće" (writer: Marko Fančović) "Shine on you crazy diamond“ (writer: Ljuan Koka), "Slomljeni svemir" (writer: Darko Macan), "Pandora Box" (writer: Alcante) and "Candide ou l'optimisme, de Voltaire" (writers: Michel Dufranne alias Miroslav Dragan & Gorian Delpâture).

He worked for publishers in Serbia (Dečje novine, Happy Metal, Lavirint, Darkwood), France (Dupuis, Delcourt) and Germany (Gespenster Geschichten). He lives in Mladenovac.

References

External links
 Bio sur bedetheque.com 

1962 births
Living people
Artists from Belgrade
Serbian comics artists
Serbian comics writers
Serbian illustrators